Enfield State Park, formerly known as Enfield State Forest, is a  state park near the locality of Enfield, approximately  south of Ballarat, in Victoria, Australia.    The Park contains a diverse range of flora and fauna, some of which are significant, including the rare Grevillea bedggoodiana, also known as the Enfield Grevillea. There is also extensive evidence of the mining and forestry activities that were undertaken throughout the area from the late 1850s to the 1960s. It was opened in 1995.

References

External links
Flowers in Enfield State park

State parks of Victoria (Australia)
Protected areas established in 1995